The Adelaide and Mary River Floodplains are a  region comprising the adjoining floodplains of the Adelaide and Mary Rivers in the Top End of Australia’s Northern Territory.  It lies east of the city of Darwin and west of Kakadu National Park and the Alligator Rivers IBA, where the rivers flow northwards through seasonally inundated tropical lowlands into the Van Diemen Gulf.

Birds
The floodplains have been identified by BirdLife International as an Important Bird Area (IBA) because they support over 1% of the world populations of several species of waterbirds, including magpie geese (up to 800,000), wandering whistling ducks (188,000), pied herons (2000), red-necked avocets (3000), little curlews (12,000), Far Eastern curlews (1050), and sharp-tailed sandpipers (2500). There are large breeding colonies containing 30,000 mixed waterbirds, significant numbers of bush stone-curlews and 11 species that either have restricted ranges or are confined to savanna biomes.

References

Rivers of the Northern Territory
Important Bird Areas of the Northern Territory
Wetlands of the Northern Territory
Floodplains of Australia